Radamel Enrique García King (16 April 1957 – 3 January 2019) was a Colombian footballer who played as a defender. He competed in the men's tournament at the 1980 Summer Olympics. He was the father of Colombian international, Radamel Falcao García. He died on 3 January 2019, aged 61.

References

External links
 

1957 births
2019 deaths
Association football central defenders
Colombian footballers
Colombia international footballers
Olympic footballers of Colombia
Footballers at the 1980 Summer Olympics
People from Santa Marta
Sportspeople from Magdalena Department